Hartmut Flöckner (born 27 June 1953) is a retired German swimmer. He competed at the 1972 and 1976 Summer Olympics in six events in total, and won a silver medal in the 4 × 100 m medley relay in 1972. His best individual results were seventh place in the 100 m and 200 m butterfly in 1972.

Between 1970 and 1974 he won one silver and four bronze medals in the 200 m individual butterfly and 4 × 100 m relays at the world and European championships.

References

1953 births
Living people
Swimmers from Berlin
People from East Berlin
German male swimmers
German male freestyle swimmers
German male butterfly swimmers
Olympic swimmers of East Germany
Swimmers at the 1972 Summer Olympics
Swimmers at the 1976 Summer Olympics
Olympic silver medalists for East Germany
World Aquatics Championships medalists in swimming
European Aquatics Championships medalists in swimming
Medalists at the 1972 Summer Olympics
Olympic silver medalists in swimming
20th-century German people
21st-century German people